The Franklin Mountains of Texas are a small range  long,  wide that extend from El Paso, Texas north into New Mexico. The Franklins were formed due to crustal extension related to the Cenozoic Rio Grande rift. Although the present topography of the range and adjoining basins is controlled by extension during rifting in the last 10 million years, faults within the range also record deformation during the Laramide orogeny, between 85 and 45 million years ago.

Much of the range is part of the Franklin Mountains State Park. The mountains are composed primarily of sedimentary rock with some igneous intrusions. Geologists refer to them as tilted-block fault mountains and in them can be found 1.25 billion-year-old Precambrian rocks, the oldest in Texas.



Gallery

See also
Beach Mountains
Chihuahuan Desert
Davis Mountains
Guadalupe Mountains
McKittrick Canyon
Trans-Pecos

References

External links

Mountain ranges of New Mexico
Mountain ranges of Doña Ana County, New Mexico
Mountain ranges of Texas
Mountain ranges of El Paso County, Texas
Geography of El Paso, Texas